, the second Imperial Japanese Navy destroyer of the name, was the lead ship of six s built under the Circle One Program. Three were laid down in JFY 1931 and the next three in JFY 1933.

History
Construction of the advanced Hatsuharu-class destroyers was intended to give the Imperial Japanese Navy smaller and more economical destroyers than the previous  and  destroyers, but with essentially the same weaponry.  These conflicting goals proved beyond contemporary destroyer design, and the resulting ships were top-heavy design, with severe stability problems and with inherent structural weaknesses. After the "Tomozuru Incident" of 1934 and "IJN 4th Fleet Incident" in 1935, Hatsuharu underwent extensive modifications on completion to remedy these issues.

Hatsuharu-class destroyers used the same 50 caliber 12.7 cm gun as the Fubuki class, but all turrets could elevate to 75° to give the main guns a minimal ability to engage aircraft .

The 61 cm Type 90 torpedo was mounted in triple tube Type 90 Model 2 launchers It was traversed by an electro-hydraulic system and could traverse 360° in twenty-five seconds. If the backup manual system was used the time required increased to two minutes. Each tube could be reloaded in twenty-three seconds using the endless wire and winch provided. Hatsuharu was laid down on 14 May 1931, launched on 22 February 1933 and commissioned on 30 September 1933.

Operational history
From the end of January 1942, she deployed with the invasion force for the Netherlands East Indies, covering landing operations at Kendari on Sulawesi as part of "Operation H" on 24 January. On 25 January, she was damaged in a collision with the cruiser  and had to withdraw to Davao for emergency repairs. Once repairs were completed by 11 February, she escorted tankers to Balikpapan, Tarakan and Makassar, rejoining her squadron on 26 February and returning with her squadron to Sasebo at the end of March for maintenance.

After returning briefly to Yokosuka Naval Arsenal for maintenance, Hatsuharu continued to patrol in the Chishima Islands, deploying out of Paramushiro or Shumshu to Kiska, making transport runs to deploy supplies and reinforcements. On 17 October, while accompanied by the destroyer , Hatsuharu was attacked by USAAF B-26 Marauder bombers off of Kiska. A direct bomb hit on her stern disabled her rudder, killing four crewmen and injuring 14 others. Oboro was sunk in the same attack, and Hatsuharu rescued 17 survivors. She limped back to Paramushiro on her own steam by 25 October 

Hatsuharu was docked at Maizuru Naval Arsenal from 6 November 1942 through 30 September 1943, and during this refit, numerous  Type 96 anti-aircraft guns and a Type 22 radar were added.

At the start of 1944, Hatsuharu was reassigned directly to Combined Fleet headquarters, and continued in escort missions between Yokosuka and Truk. She returned to northern waters from the end of February to the end of June, with additional 25 mm anti-aircraft guns added during maintenance refits at Ōminato at the end of May and Yokosuka at the end of June. In July, she made two troop transport runs to Iwo Jima as part of the Japanese preparations against the American landings. A Type 13 radar was added at the end of July. In August through October, she escorted troop convoys from Kure to Taiwan and Luzon.

In November, Hatsuharu deployed out of Manila to escort troop convoys to Ormoc on 1 November and 9 November. However, on the night of 13 November, after returning to Manila, Hatsuharu was caught in an air raid in Manila Bay. A series of near misses buckled plates and set fires, causing the ship to sink in shallow water. The attack killed 12 crewmen and injured 60 more, but 218 survived.

On 10 January 1945, Hatsuharu was removed from the navy list.

Notes

References

 OCLC 77257764

External links

Hatsuharu-class destroyers
Ships built by Sasebo Naval Arsenal
1933 ships
World War II destroyers of Japan
Shipwrecks in Manila Bay
World War II shipwrecks in the South China Sea
Maritime incidents in November 1944
Ships of the Aleutian Islands campaign